Bureau of Emigration and Overseas Employment (BEOE) is a Pakistani government bureau that regulates the overseas employment of Pakistani citizens.

History 
The BEOE was created on 1 October 1971 by the merging of three federal government departments: the National Manpower Council, the Protectorate of Emigrants, and the Directorate of Seamen's Welfare.

Originally operating under the Emigration Act of 1922 and Rules (1959), the BEOE now runs under the Emigration Ordinance 1979 XVIII and its Rules.

Responsibilities 
The BEOE regulates, facilitates and monitors the emigration process conducted by the recruitment agencies / Overseas Employment Promoters (OEPs), in the private sector. It also regulates direct overseas employment by individual Pakistanis or through their relatives and friends. 

The BEOE works to control recruitment frauds and scams and monitors employment promoters in Pakistan. BEOE maintains a thorough record of all OEPs and their activities. It maintains a list of Overseas Employment Promoters (OEPs) with active licenses.

References 

Pakistani diaspora
Pakistan federal departments and agencies
Government agencies established in 1971
1971 establishments in Pakistan